Sahnoun or Sahnoune is a surname. Notable people with the surname include:

Omar Sahnoun (1955–1980), French footballer
Mohamed Sahnoun, Algerian diplomat
Nicolas Sahnoun, French footballer
Mustapha Sahnoune, Algerian songwriter
Oussama Sahnoune, Algerian swimmer
Camélia Sahnoune, Algerian triple jumper
Mehdi Sahnoune, French boxer

See also
 a village in the Relizane Province

Surnames of Algerian origin